Senso is a 1954 Italian historical melodrama film directed and co-written by Luchino Visconti, based on Camillo Boito's novella of the same name. Set during the Third Italian War of Independence, the film follows the Italian Contessa Livia Serpieri (Alida Valli), who has an affair with the Austrian Lieutenant Franz Mahler (Farley Granger). It was Visconti's first color film.

The word senso  is Italian for "sense," "feeling," or "lust." The title refers to the delight Livia experiences while reflecting on her affair with a handsome lieutenant, in spite of her political convictions.

Historical background
Senso is set in Italy around 1866, the year the Italian-Austrian war of unification would see the Veneto and most of Friuli-Venezia Giulia united to Italy after the Seven Weeks' War between Austria on one side and Prussia and Italy on the other.

Plot
The film opens in the La Fenice opera house in Venice during a performance of Il Trovatore. At the close of Manrico's rousing aria Di quella pira, the opera is interrupted by a boisterous protest by Italian Nationalists against the occupying Austrian troops present in the theater. Livia Serpieri, an Italian countess, unhappily married to a stuffy older aristocrat, witnesses this and tries to conceal the fact that her cousin Marchese Roberto Ussoni has organized the protest. During the commotion, she meets a dashing young Austrian Lieutenant named Franz Mahler, and is instantly smitten with him. The two begin a secret love affair. Despite the fact that Franz was responsible for sending Roberto into exile for his radical behavior, Livia vainly pretends not to be aware of it.

Although Franz is obviously using Livia for her money and social status, Livia throws herself into an affair of complete sexual abandon with Franz, giving away her money and not caring what society thinks about her. But soon, Franz begins failing to show up for their trysts and Livia becomes consumed by jealousy and paranoia. The war finally forces the lovers apart, with Livia's husband taking her away to their villa in the country in order to avoid the carnage. Late one night, Franz arrives on the estate, and slips into Livia's bedroom. He asks her for more money to bribe the army doctors into keeping him off the battlefield; Livia complies, giving away all of the money she was holding for Roberto, who intended to supply it to the partisans fighting the Austrians. Livia's betrayal leads to tragic consequences; the Austrians overwhelm the under-equipped Italians.

Eventually, Livia is almost driven mad by the fact that she is unable to see Franz, but  rejoices when a letter from him finally arrives. In the letter, Franz thanks Livia for the financial support that helped him stay away from the front. He advises Livia not to look for him, but she does not listen. As soon as possible, Livia, still grasping the letter, boards a carriage and hurries to Verona to find her lover. Once there, Livia makes her way to the apartment, which she herself has rented for Franz. What she finds is a drunken, self-loathing rogue (Franz), in the company of a young prostitute, openly mocking Livia for accepting his abuse.

After forcing her to sit and drink with the prostitute, Franz brutally throws Livia out of his rooms. She finds herself in the streets, filled with drunken, amorous Austrian soldiers. Livia realizes that she still has Franz's letter, but nothing remains now except mutual self-destruction. Her sanity slipping, Livia heads to the headquarters of the Austrian Army, where she hands Franz's letter to a General, thereby convicting Franz of treason. Although the General sees that Livia is acting out of spite for being cuckolded, he is forced to comply and Franz is executed by firing squad. Livia, now insane, runs off into the night, crying out her lover's name.

Cast

Adaptation
The novella is written in the form of a private diary, narrated in first person by Countess Livia (she is from Trento, not Venice like in the film). At the present time she is courted on and off by a lawyer, Gino, whom she constantly rebuffs. Narration switches back and forth between this subplot and the main plot, which take place 16 years apart (1865). Visconti focused on the main plot, deleting the diary subplot and the character of Gino entirely.

The film pushes Livia's story into the background and gives more detail to the war itself while introducing a new subplot about Livia's nationalist cousin, Roberto Ussoni, who leads a rebellion against the Austrians. In the film, Livia gives his money to her lover, leading to a dramatic massacre of the Italian partisans, an episode not in Boito's original story. Visconti strayed so far away from the original source, that at one point he thought of renaming the film Custoza, after the big battle that occurs during the climax, but was denied due to legal reasons.

The character of Franz Mahler is named Remigio Ruz in the novella; Visconti changed the name as a tribute to Gustav Mahler, one of his favourite composers, whose music features in the later Death in Venice. There's also a thematic connection with the film's opening, set in an opera; the scene does not feature in Boito's novella, where the protagonists first meet at a swimming bath.

Production
Originally, Visconti had hoped to cast Ingrid Bergman and Marlon Brando in the lead roles. However, Bergman was then married to Italian director Roberto Rossellini, who would not allow her to work for other directors, and Brando was rejected by the producers, who considered Granger a bigger star at the time. It is also said that Brando refused the role after being informed that Bergman was not going to participate in the film. Both Franco Zeffirelli and Francesco Rosi, later accomplished film and theater directors in their own right, worked as Visconti's assistants on the picture.

Since Granger didn't speak Italian, his dialogue was dubbed by Enrico Maria Salerno in post-production.

Ironically, though Alida Valli portrays an Italian countess at odds with the Austrian empire, she was descended from Austrian nobility and held the title Freiin von Marckenstein-Frauenberg.

Filming 
The film was shot primarily in Venice and Rome, and at the Titanus and Scalera studios. The opening sequence was shot on-location at the La Fenice opera house. After the La Fenice was destroyed in a 1966 arson, stills from the film were used as references for the reconstruction. Other filming locations included Villa Godi, the Venetian Ghetto, the Cannaregio canal, Castel Sant'Angelo, and Valeggio sul Mincio.

Original cinematographer G.R. Aldo died midway through production, so Robert Krasker was brought in to take his place. Visconti's and Krasker's visions clashed however. Due to another commitment, Krasker left the production before it was completed.  Camera Operator Giuseppe Rotunno shot some important scenes including the execution of Mahler.

Farley Granger had a falling-out with Visconti towards the end of filming, he left the picture and went home to the US. Visconti handled this by using a body double to stand in for Granger's character in the final sequences—the double was told to keep his hands in front of his face the whole time, and then was dispatched with his face to the wall.

Alternate versions
A truncated English-language version, recut to 94 minutes, was released with the title The Wanton Countess and contains new dialogue written by Tennessee Williams and Paul Bowles.

Reception
G.R. Aldo's cinematography for the film received the Italian National Syndicate of Film Journalists' award. Visconti was nominated for the Golden Lion award at the 15th Venice International Film Festival. Roger Ebert gave it four out of four stars, listing it as one of his "Great Movies."

Home media
A digitally restored version of the film was released on DVD and Blu-ray by The Criterion Collection in February 2011. The release includes The Wanton Countess, the rarely seen English-language version of the film, the Making of “Senso,” a new documentary featuring Rotunno, assistant director Francesco Rosi, costume designer Piero Tosi, and Caterina D’Amico, daughter of screenwriter Suso Cecchi D’Amico and author of Life and Work of Luchino Visconti, Viva VERDI, a new documentary on Visconti, Senso, and opera, a visual essay by film scholar Peter Cowie, and Man of Three Worlds: Luchino Visconti, a 1966 BBC program exploring Visconti’s mastery of cinema, theater, and opera direction. There is also a booklet featuring an essay by filmmaker and author Mark Rappaport and an excerpt from Granger's autobiography, Include Me Out.

Senso '45

Tinto Brass re-adapted the original source material as Senso '45 (retitled Black Angel for the international release) in 2002 when he read the novella and found himself unsatisfied with Visconti's rather liberal adaptation. The film starred Anna Galiena as Livia and Gabriel Garko as her lover. The story of the film is much more faithful to Camillo Boito's work than the earlier adaptation in terms of tone and story, but the action was transported from the War of Unification to the end of World War II, with Remigio becoming a Nazi Lieutenant and Livia updated to being the wife of a high ranking Fascist official. Brass later explained that the change in time was made because he did not want to compete with Visconti's vision of Risorgimento-era Italy.

Unlike the 1954 version, Senso '45 did not romanticize the affair between Livia and Remigio/Mahler (now named "Helmut Schultz" in the new adaptation). Rather, the film showed it as a clinical study of vanity and lust. The film won Italian cinema's "Silver Ribbon" Award for best costume design.

References

External links 

Alberto Zambenedetti, " Senso - A Palimpsest", essay on luchinovisconti.net (Analysis of the film, the original novella, and the 2002 remake)
Senso and Sensibility an essay by Mark Rappaport at the Criterion Collection

1954 films
1950s historical drama films
Italian historical drama films
1950s Italian-language films
1950s German-language films
Films based on Italian novels
Films set in Venice
Films set in the 1860s
Films directed by Luchino Visconti
Films with screenplays by Suso Cecchi d'Amico
Lux Film films
1954 drama films
Films set in the Kingdom of Lombardy–Venetia
Melodrama films
Films shot in Venice
1950s Italian films